The original section of the Grove (ca. 1795), the country seat of Philip Jeremiah Schuyler and, subsequently, Mary Morton Miller, embodies the prototypical two-story, five-bay, center-hall form associated with the Federal period. Schuyler was married to Sarah Rutsen, and the land had been in the Rutsen family. The Landsman Kill, running through the property, had been the site of the Rutsen family's grist and saw mills, important settlement period industrial concerns in Rhinebeck during the early- to mid-eighteenth century. Schuyler acquired the mills, which he continued to operate, and a large parcel of land upon which he erected his elegant Federal style mansion. (The subsequent evolution of the Grove, in form, scale and decorative detailing, and its nineteenth-century historical associations place its primary significance in a later period as a 19th-century country seat.  A carriage house on the property was built in the 1890s and is attributed to the architectural firm of McKim, Mead & White.

It was added to the National Register of Historic Places in 1987.

References

Schuyler family residences
McKim, Mead & White buildings
Houses on the National Register of Historic Places in New York (state)
Houses completed in 1795
Houses in Rhinebeck, New York
National Register of Historic Places in Dutchess County, New York